Ely Creek is a stream in Ralls County in the U.S. state of Missouri. It is a tributary of Salt River.

Ely Creek has the name of Isaac Ely, a pioneer citizen.

See also
List of rivers of Missouri

References

Rivers of Ralls County, Missouri
Rivers of Missouri